The Namibian snake-eyed skink (Panaspis namibiana) is a species of lidless skinks in the family Scincidae. The species is found in Namibia and Angola.

References

Panaspis
Reptiles described in 2018
Taxa named by Luis M. P. Ceríaco
Taxa named by William Roy Branch
Taxa named by Aaron M. Bauer